Miguel A. Núñez Jr. is an American actor. He is best known for his roles in The Return of the Living Dead and Life. He played leading roles in Juwanna Mann and Tour of Duty and appears on the hit BET drama The Family Business.

Biography 
Núñez was born in New York City, is of African American and Dominican descent, and was raised by his grandparents in Wilson, North Carolina. One of his first major screen roles was the supporting role of Spider in The Return of the Living Dead, and his first major starring role was that of Marcus Taylor on the CBS series Tour of Duty, where he was a main cast member for all three seasons of the show. He later appeared on the short-lived Fox series My Wildest Dreams, as well as the short-lived UPN show Sparks as well as in movies such as Juwanna Mann. Núñez also held the recurring role of Zach in the second season of the Friends spinoff/sequel, Joey alongside Matt LeBlanc and Drea de Matteo, and portrayed Dee Jay as a supporting villain in Street Fighter opposite Jean-Claude Van Damme and Raul Julia.

Nùñez was also an executive producer of the 2014 comedy-drama musical film, School Dance, directed and written by Nick Cannon.

Filmography

Film

Television

References

External links

1964 births
Living people
Male actors from New York City
African-American male comedians
American male comedians
Hispanic and Latino American male actors
21st-century American comedians
American male film actors
American people of Dominican Republic descent
American male television actors
People from Wilson, North Carolina
21st-century African-American people